Erhard Grundmann was a German luger from Czechoslovakia. He competed between the late 1930s and the mid-1950s for Czechoslovakia and later for West Germany. He won two bronze medals in the men's doubles event at the European luge championships (1938 for Czechoslovakia, 1955 for West Germany).

References
 List of European luge champions 

Czechoslovak male lugers
German male lugers
German Bohemian people
Year of birth missing
Year of death missing
Czechoslovak people of German descent